Phodoryctis thrypticosema is a moth of the family Gracillariidae. It is known from South Africa and Zimbabwe.

The larvae feed on Craibia brevicaudata. They mine the leaves of their host plant. The mine has the form of a moderate, irregular, narrowly oblong, semi-transparent blotch-mine on the upperside of the leaf.

References

Acrocercopinae
Lepidoptera of South Africa
Lepidoptera of Zimbabwe
Moths of Sub-Saharan Africa
Moths described in 1961